Bass Hit! is a 1956 album by Ray Brown, his first album as a leader.

Track listing 
 "Bass Introduction" / "Blues for Sylvia" (Ray Brown / Brown, Marty Paich) – 5:04
 "All of You" (Cole Porter) – 4:00
 "Everything I Have Is Yours" (Harold Adamson, Burton Lane) – 4:28
 "Will You Still Be Mine?" (Tom Adair, Matt Dennis) – 3:42
 "Little Toe" (Brown) – 4:52
 "Alone Together" (Howard Dietz, Arthur Schwartz) – 4:46
 "Solo for Unaccompanied Bass" (Brown) – 2:30
 "My Foolish Heart" (Ned Washington, Victor Young) – 4:09
 "Blues for Lorraine" / "Bass Conclusion" (Brown, Paich / Brown) – 5:36

Bonus tracks on CD reissue in 1999:
"After You've Gone Medley" (False Start/Breakdown/False Start/Complete Take) (Henry Creamer, Turner Layton) – 2:50 
 "After You've Gone" (Complete Take) – 4:49
 "After You've Gone Medley" (False Start/Breakdown/Breakdown/Complete Take) – 3:01
 "After You've Gone" (Complete Take) – 2:44

Personnel

Performance 
 Ray Brown – double bass
 Pete Candoli – trumpet
 Herbie Harper – trombone
 Jack DuLong – alto saxophone
 Jimmy Giuffre – clarinet, tenor saxophone
 Bill Holman – tenor saxophone
 Jimmy Rowles – piano
 Herb Ellis – guitar
 Mel Lewis – drums
 Marty Paich – arranger, conductor

References 

1957 debut albums
Ray Brown (musician) albums
Albums arranged by Marty Paich
Albums produced by Norman Granz
Verve Records albums
Albums conducted by Marty Paich